Austin Hudson may refer to:

 Sir Austin Hudson, 1st Baronet (1897–1956), British Conservative politician
 Austin Hudson (soccer) (born 1959), American soccer player and coach

See also
Austen Hudson (1894–1970), British Conservative politician